Godfrid may refer to:

Gudfred (died 810), king of the Danes
Godfrid Haraldsson (820–56), son of King Harald Klak in Jutland
Godfrid, Duke of Frisia (died 885), Viking duke in Frisia
Godfrid Storms (1911–2003), Dutch professor of Old and Middle English Literature

See also
Godfrey (name)
Gottfried
Gofraid